The 2018 Oklahoma Sooners football team represents the University of Oklahoma in the 2018 NCAA Division I FBS football season, the 124th season for the  Oklahoma Sooners. The team is led by Lincoln Riley, who is in his second year as head coach. They play their home games at Gaylord Family Oklahoma Memorial Stadium in Norman, Oklahoma. They are a charter member of the Big 12 Conference.

Conference play began with a 37–27 win against Iowa State in Ames, Iowa and ended with a 59–56 win against West Virginia in Morgantown, West Virginia. Oklahoma finished conference play with the best record in the conference with an 8–1 record. They went on to play Texas in the 2018 Big 12 Championship Game which they won 39–27 to win their twelfth, and fourth consecutive, Big 12 championship.

In the final College Football Playoff rankings of the season, Oklahoma was ranked fourth, earning them a spot in the 2018 Orange Bowl, in a national semi-final game against first-seeded Alabama. This was Oklahoma's second consecutive and third overall CFP bid. The Sooners lost to the Crimson Tide, 34–45, marking the sixth consecutive loss for the school in CFP semi-finals or BCS national championship games.

Sooners quarterback Kyler Murray, following in the wake of Heisman Trophy winner Baker Mayfield, earned several national honors himself, including winning the school's second consecutive and seventh overall Heisman Trophy. This was the first time that quarterbacks from the same school won the award in back to back seasons.

Previous season 
The Sooners finished the season 12–2, 8–1 in Big 12 play. Finishing with the best record in conference play the Sooners clinched a berth in the conference championship game where they defeated TCU 41–17 to win their 11th Big 12 Championship. Oklahoma was selected as the second seed to play in the 2017 College Football playoff against third seed Georgia Bulldogs in the 2018 Rose Bowl, which ended up being a 48–54 loss in double overtime.

Recruiting

Position key

Recruits

The Sooners signed a total of 22 recruits.

Preseason

Award watch lists
Listed in the order that they were released

Big 12 media poll
The Big 12 media poll was released on July 12, 2018 with the Sooners predicted to win the Big 12.

Schedule
Oklahoma announced its 2018 football schedule on October 26, 2017. The 2018 schedule consists of 7 home games, 4 away games and 1 neutral-site game in the regular season. The Sooners will host three non-conference games against FAU, UCLA and Army. Oklahoma will host Baylor, Kansas, Kansas State, Oklahoma State and travel to Iowa State, TCU, Texas Tech, West Virginia in regular conference play. Oklahoma will play Texas in Dallas, Texas at the Cotton Bowl Stadium on October 6 in the Red River Showdown, the 113th game played in the series.

Personnel

Roster

Coaching staff

Depth chart

Game summaries

Florida Atlantic

UCLA

at Iowa State

Army

Baylor

vs Texas

at TCU

Kansas State

Kansas State has a week off between the previous win against Oklahoma State and their next game against Oklahoma.  Oklahoma's new defensive coordinator Ruffin McNeill was able to simplify the defensive plan which helped turn out good results against Texas Christian in the previous week with a Sooner victory 52-27.  K-State's Coach Snyder commented: "They're very much the same football team that they were on the defensive side of the ball, on both sides actually, but certainly on the defensive side.  I saw some tweaks, a few things, that you might consider to be changes -- don't know if they're changes or are just there and hadn't surfaced previously. But by and large, it's the same defense."

When the game rolled around, both the offense and the defense for Oklahoma performed to control the game from start to finish, with a final score of 51-14 and an Oklahoma win.

at Texas Tech

Oklahoma State

Trey Sermon 124 rushing yards

Kansas

at West Virginia

vs Texas

vs. #1 Alabama (CFP Semifinal) 

Sources:

Statistics

Statistics

Scoring
Scores against non-conference opponents

Scores against the Big 12

Scores against all opponents

2019 NFL Draft

Rankings

References

 

Oklahoma
Oklahoma Sooners football seasons
Big 12 Conference football champion seasons
Oklahoma Sooners football